The Summer of Massacre is 2011 anthology horror film written and directed by Joe Castro. It is listed in Guinness World Records as the slasher film with the largest body count, at 155.

Plot 
 Rampage: While out for a jog, Chris is mugged and knocked out by three thugs. When the now disfigured Chris awakens, he (apparently suffering from brain damage incurred from being beaten) embarks on a killing spree, butchering everyone he comes across with whatever objects he can get his hands on. When he finally returns home, Chris discovers the three robbers from earlier have broken in, so he shoots two of them, tortures the third to death, and commits suicide by ripping his own mutilated face off.
 Lump: On a road trip out to the forest with her friends and siblings, Kimberly Ann Harrison tries to murder her severely handicapped and deformed hermaphroditic sister Lori by shoving her off a cliff. Lori survives the fall, so Kimberly Ann forces her boyfriend Danny and dimwitted stepbrother Mikey into finishing her off, as a "mercy kill". Apparently due to experimental medical procedures she had been recently undergoing, Lori returns to life and kills every member of the group except Kimberly Ann, whose back she breaks, paralyzing her and leaving her catatonic. Sometime later, the sisters are shown outside a hospital with their mother, who tells a doctor that the authorities never did piece together what happened out in the woods on that fateful day.
 Son of the Boogyman: While out at a restaurant, Jesse tells his fiancée that when his mother was a teenager, she was raped and impregnated with him by a seemingly supernatural man known only as "Mr. Boogens". Jesse's mother escaped, and she and her son have spent most of their lives running from Mr. Boogens, who has wiped out all their relatives. After telling his story, Jesse is called by Mr. Boogens, who is using his mother's phone. Jesse and his fiancé return home, where they discover the bodies of Jesse's mother and two police officers, right before Mr. Boogens kills Jesse's fiancé. Jesse is chased through the city by Mr. Boogens, who murders everyone he seeks help from, before finally catching Jesse and biting most of his face off. At the hospital, the mangled Jesse is finished off by Mr. Boogens, who also kills everyone else in the building.
 Burn: During their last night at a church camp, a group of campers tell the story of Devon Hopper and Michael Rose, two gay fire fighters who were seemingly killed by their bigoted co-workers during a forest fire in that very same area. A year after the two men disappeared, everyone involved in their supposed deaths started being killed off, usually in the woods. When all the employees of Fire Station 14 were eliminated, their relatives started dying. When the story is finished, the campers become disturbed when they realize they are all in some way connected to Fire Station 14, but they decide to ignore this and go to bed. When Lisa awakens, she finds all her friends and everyone else from the camp dead from fire-related injuries, and is chased through the forest by the charred Devon and Michael, eventually finding their cave lair, and her injured boyfriend, Vinnie. Lisa kills one of the vengeful fire fighters, only for the other to cut her head off, and murder Vinnie.
 Kitchen: Fifteen-year-old Edie witnesses her mother being stabbed to death by a masked man in their kitchen. Five years later, Edie is having a party with her friends Johnny, Eva, Colin, Liz and Shane in her house. Colin puts on the same mask as Edie's mother's killer and scares Edie. This causes her to have a psychotic break and stab him to death with a kitchen knife. She then hacks Liz to death with a cleaver, stabs Shane in the neck with a meat thermometer, and bludgeons Johnny with a frying pan. She then advances menacingly towards Eva, but Eva coaxes Edie out of her psychotic episode. However, a still living Johnny then appears and smashes a block of ice on Eva's head. He then reveals that he killed Edie's mother and strangles Edie with the cord for the refrigerator. However, just as Johnny is about to leave the house, a dying Eva beats him to death with two frying pans before collapsing on the floor.
 The Warehouse: At the end of the first three segments interviews with three incarcerated serial killers are shown. In the finale, it is revealed that the killers had somehow escaped prison, joined forces, and are holed up in a warehouse with dozens of dead and dying victims. When his two accomplices are shot to death by the police, the final killer detonates an atomic bomb he had somehow acquired, destroying all of Los Angeles. As the credits roll, news reports state that the repercussions of "the Los Angeles nuclear massacre" will continue to be felt for centuries to come.

Cast 

 Rampage:
 Tim A. Cooley as Chris
 Daniel Aldema as Bully #1
 Timothy Hearl as Bully #2
 Nick Rey Angelus as Bully #3
 Lump:
 Nick Principe as Lori Williams
 Brinke Stevens as Mrs. Williams
 Lisa M. Garcia as Kimberly Ann Williams
 Ted Alderman as Doctor Harrison
 Rene Pena as Danny
 John Karyus as Mikey Williams
 Vida Ghaffari as Nicole
 Evan Owen as Jerry
 Son of the Boogyman:
 Tchia Casselle as Melanie
 Scott Barrows as Mr. Boogens
 Jerry Angelo as Jesse
 Kimmarie Johnson as Jesse's Fiancé
 Deanna Meske as Young Melanie
 Burn:
 Lauren Boehm as Lisa
 Felipe Winslett as Vinnie
 Chris Staviski as Bradley
 London Hilton as Conrad
 Justin Marchert as Carmen
 Cleve A. Hall as Father Daniel
 Joe Castro as Michael Rose
 J T Seaton as Devon Hopper
 Kitchen:
 Stephanie Laury as Edie
 Carlos Shane as Johnny / Masked Man
 Katie West as Eva
 Leigh Muller as Shane
 Jane Mace as Liz
 Thomas Cooligan as Colin
 Allison Stacey as Edie's Mother
 The Warehouse:
 Joe Mannetti as Richard Khan
 Bahram Khosraviani as George Vic
 Dan Lovell as Dax Malone

Production 

Director Joe Castro did not originally set out to specifically break the record for most kills, but he did want to break a record of some kind.  Eventually, he decided on the number of kills.  Although his method of using computer graphics drew criticism, Castro used real actors and only digitally modified what was already shot.

Release 

Breaking Glass Pictures and Vicious Circle Films released The Summer of Massacre on DVD on January 10, 2012.

Reception 

Mark L. Miller of Ain't It Cool News wrote, "Those not looking for substance with their gore should seek out SUMMER OF MASSACRE; an impressive, grue-strewn gorefest."  Spencer Perry of Shock Till You Drop wrote, "The Summer of Massacre is like if you took a three minute “horror movie” that some kid made for YouTube with computer-generated gore and only the remnants of a 'story' and stretched it out for almost 100 minutes. It's boring, dumb, offensive, and most importantly not scary at all."  Kurt Dahlke of DVD Talk rated it 3.5/5 stars and recommended it to people with a short attention span who only want to see gory kills.  Gordon Sullivan of DVD Verdict wrote, "The Summer of Massacre strives mightily to give genre fans what they want by spending 98 minutes on killing 155 people, but in the end, it's brought down by a combination of dodgy CGI and lack of character development."

References

External links 

 
 
 

2011 films
American anthology films
2011 horror films
American disaster films
American LGBT-related films
American exploitation films
Films about nuclear war and weapons
American films about revenge
Films directed by Joe Castro
Films set in Los Angeles
Films shot in Los Angeles
American monster movies
American serial killer films
American slasher films
American splatter films
Films about summer camps
LGBT-related horror films
2011 LGBT-related films
2010s English-language films
2010s American films